Joachim Gérard defeated Alfie Hewett in the final, 6–0, 4–6, 6–4 to win the men's singles wheelchair tennis title at the 2021 Australian Open.

Shingo Kunieda was the defending champion, but was defeated by Hewett in the semifinals.

Seeds

Draw

Bracket

References

External links
 Drawsheet on ausopen.com

Wheelchair Men's Singles
2021 Men's Singles